Plebs is a genus of orb-weaver spiders first described by M. M. Joseph & V. W. Framenau in 2012. Though many of its species have been moved around, a 2012 taxonomic revision suggested that these spiders comprise a monophyletic genus of closely related spiders that evolved in Australia and, through subsequent movements, spread into parts of Asia and Pacific islands.

Species
 it contains twenty-two species. Seven are found in Australia, thirteen in Asia, one on New Caledonia, and one endemic to Vanuatu.
Plebs arleneae Joseph & Framenau, 2012 – Australia (Queensland, New South Wales)
Plebs arletteae Joseph & Framenau, 2012 – Australia (Lord Howe Is.)
Plebs astridae (Strand, 1917) – China, Korea, Taiwan, Japan
Plebs aurea (Saito, 1934) – Japan
Plebs baotianmanensis (Hu, Wang & Wang, 1991) – China
Plebs bradleyi (Keyserling, 1887) – Southeastern Australia, Tasmania
Plebs cyphoxis (Simon, 1908) – Australia (Western Australia, South Australia)
Plebs eburnus (Keyserling, 1886) (type) – Eastern Australia, Tasmania
Plebs himalayaensis (Tikader, 1975) – India
Plebs mitratus (Simon, 1895) – India
Plebs neocaledonicus (Berland, 1924) – New Caledonia
Plebs oculosus (Zhu & Song, 1994) – China
Plebs opacus Joseph & Framenau, 2012 – Vanuatu
Plebs patricius Joseph & Framenau, 2012 – Australia (Victoria, Tasmania)
Plebs plumiopedellus (Yin, Wang & Zhang, 1987) – China, Taiwan
Plebs poecilus (Zhu & Wang, 1994) – China
Plebs rosemaryae Joseph & Framenau, 2012 – Australia (Queensland, Norfolk Is.)
Plebs sachalinensis (Saito, 1934) – Russia (Far East), China, Korea, Japan
Plebs salesi Joseph & Framenau, 2012 – New Guinea
Plebs sebastiani Joseph & Framenau, 2012 – Philippines
Plebs tricentrus (Zhu & Song, 1994) – China
Plebs yanbaruensis (Tanikawa, 2000) – Japan

References

Araneidae
Spiders of Asia
Spiders of Australia
Spiders of Oceania
Araneomorphae genera